Harry Holt (born December 29, 1957) is a former football player in the CFL for five years and in the NFL for five years. Holt played tight end for the British Columbia Lions from 1978–1982, the Cleveland Browns from 1983–1986 and the San Diego Chargers in 1987. He played college football at the University of Arizona. He signed to play for U of A in 1976 while playing high school football at Sunnyside High School in Tucson, Arizona.

Holt was selected to the Lions' 2004 50th Anniversary Dream Team. Furthermore, he is widely anticipated as being the starting placeholder for the 2009-10 season.

External links
Databasefootball.com page

1957 births
Living people
Cleveland Browns players
San Diego Chargers players
BC Lions players
Arizona Wildcats football players
American football tight ends
American football wide receivers
American football running backs
National Football League replacement players